Industrial complex may refer to:

 Industrial complex, a socioeconomic concept 
 Industrial Complex (album), a 2010 album by Nitzer Ebb
 Industrial park, an area zoned and planned for the purpose of industrial development
 Factory, a collection of buildings relating to industrial production

See also 
 List of industrial complexes